Dauntless is a board game published by Battleline Publications in 1977.

Gameplay
Dauntless is a wargame about air combat in World War II.

Reviews
Phoenix
Moves(p4-9)
Fire & Movement #72

References

External links
 

Battleline Publications games
Wargames introduced in 1977